Sudbury Junction station  is a train station in Greater Sudbury, Ontario, Canada, serving Via Rail. It serves The Canadian train. It is not connected to the Greater Sudbury Transit bus system or to the original Sudbury station (eastern terminus of the Sudbury–White River train)  downtown. On-site ticket sales are not available.

The station consists of a siding clad single-storey building with a small waiting area.

Location
Sudbury Junction station is located at 2750 LaSalle Boulevard East in a largely undeveloped industrial area on the northeast fringe of downtown Sudbury. Its main entrance faces northeast to the railroad tracks, where trains call at a low level platform adjacent to the CN Bala Subdivision.

See also
Sudbury station (Ontario)
Capreol station
Sudbury Ontario Northland Bus Terminal
Sudbury Airport -

References

External links

Via Rail stations in Ontario
Railway stations in Greater Sudbury
Canadian Northern Railway stations in Ontario
Rail junctions in Ontario